The Katunga Football Netball Club, nicknamed the Swans, is an Australian rules football and netball club playing in the Picola & District Football League. Katunga Football Club joined the Picola & District Football League in 1951 and has called the league its home ever since.

The club is based in the small Victorian town of Katunga. The league split into two divisions in 2009 which placed Katunga in the South East Division.

They still compete against close rivals Waaia, however now do not have the traditional rival match against Strathmerton, as they are in the North West Division.

Football competitions
Gedye's Victoria Hotel Cup
1892 (Runners Up to Cobram FC)
Goulburn Valley Football Association
1893 to ?
Federal District Football Association
1899 to ?

Premierships
Goulburn Valley Football Association
 1893, 1894, 1895, 1899
Picola & District Football League
Seniors (1sts)  
1968, 1977, 1983, 1984
Reserves (2nds) 
1960, 1962, 1966, 1971, 1983, 1984, 1989, 2001
Thirds (3rds) 
1968, 1972, 1976, 1977, 1978, 1979, 1980, 1990, 1993, 1995, 2007, 2019
Fourths (4ths) 
1971, 1978, 1984, 1989, 1990, 1991, 1992, 1993, 1994, 2005

The club's shorts varies for home and away games. Red shorts are worn at home games and white shorts are worn at away games.

References

External links
 Gameday site
 Katunga FNC profile on Footypedia 

Picola & District Football League clubs
1951 establishments in Australia